Paul Q. Kolderie is an American record producer, engineer, and mixer. He has worked with Pixies, Radiohead, Orangutang, Hole, Dinosaur Jr., Juliana Hatfield, Wax, Warren Zevon, Uncle Tupelo, Throwing Muses, Morphine, the Mighty Mighty Bosstones, Abandoned Pools, the Go-Go's, and Mike Gordon of Phish. He usually works with production partner Sean Slade.

Kolderie and Slade were friends from Yale University, where they played in bands together. They also became members of Sex Execs, a Boston-based new wave music band of the early 1980s.

The duo had their formative experience as producers while they were in Sex Execs. Most of the group lived in a house in Dorchester, Boston that was wired up as a primitive studio. Other bands came over to record as well, including a local act called Three Colors, which featured saxophonist Dana Colley, later of Morphine. As Sex Execs became more successful, they started recording in professional studios such as Syncro Sound, which was owned by The Cars. Kolderie learned a lot from the engineers there. He got to record an EP for Three Colors at Syncro, earning his first production credit.

In 1985, Kolderie and Slade helped create Boston's Fort Apache Studios with Jim Fitting, another friend from Yale and Sex Execs, as well as musician-producer Joe Harvard.

Kolderie has also played in Detroit-based cowpunk band, Goober & the Peas, and contributed to Raisins in the Sun.

Albums

Produced
{{columns-list|colwidth=30em|
Big Dipper – Heavens, 1987
Bullet LaVolta – The Gift, 1989
Das Damen – Mousetrap, 1989
Hullabaloo – Beat Until Stiff, 1989
Blood Oranges – Corn River, 1990
The Mighty Mighty Bosstones – Devil's Night Out, 1990
The Lemonheads – Favorite Spanish Dishes, 1990
The Lemonheads – Lovey, 1990
Uncle Tupelo – No Depression, 1990
Clockhammer – Carrot, 1991
Firehose – Flyin' the Flannel, 1991
Clockhammer – Klinefelter, 1991
Field Trip – Ripe, 1991
Uncle Tupelo – Still Feel Gone, 1991
Titanics – Titanics (Taang!), 1991
Morphine – Good, 1992
Buffalo Tom – Let Me Come Over, 1992
The Mighty Mighty Bosstones – More Noise and Other Disturbances, 1992
The Mighty Mighty Bosstones – Where'd You Go?, 1992
Blackfish – Blackfish, 1993
The Welcome Mat – Gram, 1993
Morphine – Cure for Pain, 1993
Gigolo Aunts – Full-On Bloom, 1993
Radiohead – Pablo Honey, 1993
Belly – Are You Experienced, 1994
Firehose – Big Bottom Pow Wow, 1994
Miles Dethmuffen – Clutter, 1994
Orangutang – Dead Sailor Acid Blues, 1994
Gigolo Aunts – Flippin' Out, 1994
Tripmaster Monkey – Goodbye Race, 1994
Tackle Box – Grand Hotel, 1994
Hole – Live Through This, 1994
Belly – Moon, 1994
The Mighty Mighty Bosstones – Question the Answers, 1994
Wax – 13 Unlucky Numbers, 1995
Echobelly – Great Things, Pt.1, 1995
Echobelly – Great Things, Pt.2, 1995
Morphine – Honey White, 1995
The Upper Crust – Let Them Eat Rock, 1995
The Mighty Mighty Bosstones – Let's Face It, 1997
Warren Zevon - Life'll Kill Ya, 2000 
Piebald – We Are the Only Friends We Have, 2002
Jason Bennett & the Resistance – Hope Dies Last-, 2008
Portugal. The Man- The Satanic Satanist, 2009
Big D & The Kids Table- Fluent in Stroll, 2009
Grant Langston & The Supermodels – Working Until I Die, 2012
Sirsy – Coming into Frame, 2013
Mike Gordon – Overstep, 2014
}}

Mixed
Papas Fritas – Papas Fritas, 1995
12 Rods – Split Personalities, 1998
The Sounds – Dying to Say This to You, 2006
Joe Jackson – Rain, 2008
Portugal. The Man – Censored Colors, 2008
Buffalo Tom – Skins, 2011
Peter Baldrachi – Tomorrow Never Knows'', 2011
Grant Langston & The Supermodels – Working Until I Die, 2012
The Peasants – Big Sunny Day, 2015
Spirit Family Reunion – "Hands Together", 2015
Amy Fairchild  - [Amy Fairchild] 2014

Engineered

Songs produced
Goo Goo Dolls – "Lazy Eye", 1997

References

Year of birth missing (living people)
Living people
Record producers from Michigan
Record producers from Massachusetts
Musicians from Boston
Musicians from Detroit